In Hungarian politics, a fake party or business party is a political party registered for the sole purpose of receiving state funding. The phenomenon started during the campaign for the 2014 Hungarian parliamentary election, as a result of simplification of the political party registration resulting in significantly lower barriers for party registration. During the 2014 election, an estimated 4 billion forint of subsidies were given to fake parties. In order to receive access to the ballot, a party requires 500 valid signatures from voters, although fake parties often use forged signatures including ones also on the lists of Fidesz. Most fake parties often receive low shares of the vote, although votes for fake parties reached 3% in 2014.

References 

Political scandals in Hungary